Anaysi Hernández Sarriá (born August 30, 1981) is a Cuban judoka. She won the silver medal in the women's 70kg at the 2008 Summer Olympics.

External links
 
 Athlete bio at 2008 Olympics site

1981 births
Living people
Olympic judoka of Cuba
Judoka at the 2008 Summer Olympics
Olympic silver medalists for Cuba
Olympic medalists in judo
Medalists at the 2008 Summer Olympics
Cuban female judoka
Judoka at the 2004 Summer Olympics
Universiade medalists in judo
Universiade silver medalists for Cuba
21st-century Cuban women